Kesao (written:  or ) is a masculine Japanese given name. Notable people with the name include:

 Japanese general
, Japanese astronomer

Japanese masculine given names